Drygalski Fjord is a bay  wide which recedes northwestwards , entered immediately north of Nattriss Head along the southeast coast of South Georgia. It was charted by the Second German Antarctic Expedition, 1911–12, under Wilhelm Filchner, and named for Professor Erich von Drygalski, the leader of the First German Antarctica Expedition, 1901–03.

According to L. Harrison Matthews, Drygalski Fjord might have been the place where Anthony de la Roché spent two weeks during his stay in the island in April 1675.

Named locations
Nattriss Head, a small but prominent rock headland, marks the south side of the entrance to Drygalski Fjord. Like the fjord, it was charted by Filchner's expedition. It was originally named Nattriss Point for E.A. Nattriss, shipping officer to the Discovery Committee, following survey by Discovery Investigations personnel in 1927. It was later renamed Nattriss Head to avoid confusion with Nattriss Point on Saunders Island in the South Sandwich Islands.

It was surveyed by the South Georgia Survey in the period 1951–57, and named by the UK Antarctic Place-Names Committee for American economist Karl Brandt. Mount Mair sits south of Brandt Cove, separating it from Larsen Harbour.

References 

Bays of South Georgia